In enzymology, a glucuronate isomerase is an enzyme that catalyzes the chemical reaction

D-glucuronate  D-fructuronate

Hence, this enzyme has one substrate, D-glucuronate, and one product, D-fructuronate.

This enzyme belongs to the family of isomerases, specifically those intramolecular oxidoreductases interconverting aldoses and ketoses.  The systematic name of this enzyme class is D-glucuronate aldose-ketose-isomerase. Other names in common use include uronic isomerase, uronate isomerase, D-glucuronate isomerase, uronic acid isomerase, and D-glucuronate ketol-isomerase.  This enzyme participates in pentose and glucuronate interconversions.

Structural studies

References

 
 

EC 5.3.1
Enzymes of known structure